The Last Communion of Saint Jerome or The Communion of Saint Jerome is a 1592 to 1597 oil on canvas painting by Agostino Carracci, produced for San Girolamo alla Certosa church in Bologna and now in the Pinacoteca Nazionale di Bologna.

History

Last Communion originally hung in San Girolamo opposite the 1592 The Preaching of Saint John the Baptist by Agostino's cousin Ludovico, now also in the Pinacoteca Nazionale di Bologna. It is thought Agostino's work was painted around the same time, with both works forming part of a redecoration of the church. A drawing of the same subject by Ludovico (now in the Metropolitan Museum of Art) has very similar figures of the saint and the priest administering the sacrament, perhaps meaning Ludovico assisted Agostino in producing Last Communion The work is praised in a lengthy passage of Giovanni Pietro Bellori's Lives of the Artists (1672), calling it Agostino's masterpiece.

Carlo Cesare Malvasia's Felsina Pittrice (1678) states that Agostino severely delayed completion of the work, only working on it occasionally and completely abandoning it for long periods, even considering returning the advance fee on the work to free himself from the commission until he was finally convinced to complete it via efforts of Orazio Spinola, papal vice-legate in Bologna. Spinola received that post in 1597 meaning that - if Malvasia's story is believed - the work was only completed very shortly after that date, after which Agostino is recorded as following his brother Annibale to Rome. This would mean the work took five years. The large number of figures in a closed space suggests a later date to some art historians.

A few decades after the completion of Communion, it was the subject of a dispute between Domenichino and Lanfranco, both trained by the Carracci. In 1614 Domenichino finished a painting on the same subject for the church of San Girolamo alla Carità in Rome, with several similarities to Agostino's treatment. A few years later, when Domenichino and Lanfranco were competing for important commissions in Rome, the latter accused the former of plagiarising Agostino's work. Lanfranco even had his student François Perrier create a print of Agostino's painting to prove his point, since it was less well known in Rome than in Bologna. The episode did little damage to Domenichino and Bellori "acquitted" him of plagiarism and called his version of the subject a "praiseworthy imitation" of Agostino's treatment.

The work was seized by French troops in 1796 and taken to Paris, whence it only returned in 1817 after the Congress of Vienna restored it to the Papal States, of which Bologna was then a part.

Analysis

References

Paintings by Agostino Carracci
Paintings in the collection of the Pinacoteca Nazionale di Bologna
Paintings of Jerome
1597 paintings